Răchiteni is a commune in Iași County, Western Moldavia, Romania. It is composed of three villages: Izvoarele, Răchiteni and Ursărești. These belonged to Mircești Commune until 2004, when they were split off to form a separate commune.

References

Communes in Iași County
Localities in Western Moldavia